The 1996 World Junior Figure Skating Championships was a figure skating competition sanctioned by the International Skating Union in which younger figure skaters competed for the title of World Junior Champion. It was held from 26 November – 2 December 1995 in Brisbane, Australia. Due to the large number of participants, the men's and ladies' qualifying groups were split into groups A and B.

Medals table

Results

Men
Zhengxin Guo landed a clean quadruple toe-loop in his free skating performance.

Ladies

Pairs

Ice dancing

References

External links
 results

World Junior Figure Skating Championships
1996 in figure skating
World Junior Championships
World Junior 1996
Sports competitions in Brisbane